John Ambrose may refer to:
 John Ambrose (Royal Navy officer) (–1771)
 John Ambrose (politician), Malaysian politician
 John Wolfe Ambrose (1838–1899), Irish-American engineer and developer
 John A. Ambrose, American professor of medicine